iTunes Session is the fifth EP by Australian musician Matt Corby, released only in Australia and New Zealand on 7 December 2012. The EP was recorded in Studios 301 in Sydney before Corby headed to Europe.

The EP debuted and peaked at number 19 on the ARIA chart in December 2012.

Track listing

Charts

References

2012 EPs
Matt Corby albums
2012 live albums
Live EPs
ITunes Session